Patrick Carlin (17 December 1929 – 8 April 2012) was an English professional footballer who played as a right-back for Bradford Park Avenue.

References

1929 births
2012 deaths
People from the Metropolitan Borough of Doncaster
English footballers
Association football fullbacks
Bradford (Park Avenue) A.F.C. players
English Football League players